Protaspis is an extinct genus of pteraspidid heterostracan agnathan which lived during the Early Devonian of the United States, with fossils found in marine strata in what is now Utah, Wyoming and Idaho.

References

Pteraspidiformes genera
Devonian jawless fish
Devonian fish of North America
Fossils of the United States